Viburnum maculatum (locally known as Orjenska hudika) is a species of plant in the family Adoxaceae. It is found in Montenegro on Lovćen and Orjen mountains, as well as in parts of Bosnia and Herzegovina. This plant is a xerophyte, and grows on karst mountain terrains.

References

maculatum
Data deficient plants
Flora of Montenegro